Pleocola limnoriae is a species of tardigrades. It is the only species of the genus Pleocola, which belongs to the family Styraconyxidae. The species and genus were named by Alexandre Cantacuzène in 1951. It has been found in the North Atlantic Ocean, type locality Roscoff, Brittany, France. It was discovered living in commensalism on the isopod Limnoria lignorum.

References

Styraconyxidae
Fauna of the Atlantic Ocean
Animals described in 1951